The Australian Army Catering Corps (AACC) is the corps within the Australian Army that is responsible for preparing and serving of meals. The corps was established on 12 March 1943.

See also
 Combat Ration One Man
 Field ration
 Field Ration Eating Device

References

External links
 
 
 

 
 

Catering
1943 establishments in Australia
Military units and formations established in 1943
Military food
.